Pseudothyrea oppenheimi is a fossil species of beetles in the family Buprestidae, the only species in the genus Pseudothyrea.

References

Monotypic Buprestidae genera